Emmanuel Tjeknavorian (born April 22, 1995 in Vienna, Austria) is an Austrian violinist and conductor. His father, Loris Tjeknavorian is the Iranian-Armenian composer and conductor.

Awards and competitions 
In 2012, he represented Austria at the Eurovision Young Musicians contest.

In September 2014, Tjeknavorian was the first Austrian to make it to the final round in the history of the Fritz Kreisler Competition, where he won third place. In November 2014, he received the Casinos Austria Rising Star Award. In December 2015, he placed second in the International Jean Sibelius Violin Competition.

References

External links 
 Emmanuel Tjeknavorian - official website
 Emmanuel Tjeknavorian - Armenian National Music
 Emmanuel Tjeknavorian plays „Zigeunerweisen“ by Sarasate

Living people
Austrian violinists
Male violinists
Armenian violinists
Austrian people of Armenian descent
Eurovision Young Musicians Finalists
1995 births
21st-century violinists
21st-century male musicians